Mikhail Osipovich Mikeshin (1835–1896) was a Russian artist who regularly worked for the Romanov family and designed a number of outdoor statues in the major cities of the Russian Empire.

Biography
Mikeshin was born on 21 February 1835 in a village near Roslavl. When he attended the Imperial Academy of Arts in 1852–58, his Romantic treatment of patriotic themes won him the admiration of the Russian royalty and he was asked to teach drawing to the Grand Duchesses.

Although his forte was battle painting, Mikeshin's sketch won the much-publicized contest for the monument to the Millennium of Russia in 1859. Henceforward, commissions were plentiful. He illustrated the official motto Orthodoxy, Autocracy, and Nationality in designs for bombastic outdoor statues of Kuzma Minin in Nizhny Novgorod, Admiral Greig in Nikolayev, and Alexander II of Russia in Rostov-on-Don.

Only a few of Mikeshin's outdoor monuments survived the Soviet years. These include the statues of Catherine the Great in Saint Petersburg (1873), Bohdan Khmelnytsky in Kiev (1888), and Yermak in Novocherkassk (1904). He also won competitions to erect monuments abroad, e.g., the statue of Pedro IV in Lisbon.

The Khmelnytsky monument was at the center of controversy, as the original version would have depicted the 17th-century Cossack leader trampling a Pole, a Jew, and a Catholic priest under the hoofs of the horse. This xenophobic element was removed in the monument as finally erected.

In 1876–1878, Mikeshin was the editor of Pchela, a satirical magazine in which he published his caricatures and illustrations to the works of Nikolai Gogol and Taras Shevchenko. He died on 31 January 1896 in Saint Petersburg.

Works

References

Literature
 A. Savinov. Mikeshin. Moscow, 1971
 
 

1835 births
1896 deaths
People from Roslavlsky District
People from Roslavlsky Uyezd
19th-century sculptors from the Russian Empire
19th-century male artists from the Russian Empire
Russian male sculptors
Burials at Nikolskoe Cemetery